A. (Alec) S. Patrić is an Australian novelist and short story writer. Patrić was born in Zemun, Serbia and migrated to Australia with his family when he was still a child.<ref>[https://anzlitlovers.com/2015/04/01/meet-an-aussie-author-a-s-patric/ "Meet an Aussie Author - A. S. Patrić", ANZLitLovers weblog, 1 April 2015]</ref> He won the 2016 Miles Franklin Award for his debut novel Black Rock White City.

Patrić lectures in creative writing at the University of Melbourne and is also a bookseller in St Kilda, Victoria.

 Bibliography 

 Novels 
 Black Rock White City (2015)
 Atlantic Black (2017)

 Short story collection 
 The Rattler and Other Stories (2011)
 Las Vegas for Vegans (2012)
 Bruno Kramzer: A Long Story (2013)
 The Butcherbird Stories (2018)

References

 External links 

 
 Reviews of Atlantic Black, Las Vegas for Vegans and Bruno Kramzer - Booklover Book Reviews''

21st-century Australian writers
Australian male novelists
Miles Franklin Award winners
Academic staff of the University of Melbourne
Serbian emigrants to Australia
Living people
Year of birth missing (living people)
Australian people of Serbian descent